ISO 3166-2:BL is the entry for Saint Barthélemy in ISO 3166-2, part of the ISO 3166 standard published by the International Organization for Standardization (ISO), which defines codes for the names of the principal subdivisions (e.g., provinces or states) of all countries coded in ISO 3166-1.

Currently no ISO 3166-2 codes are defined in the entry for Saint Barthélemy. The territory has no defined subdivisions.

Saint Barthélemy, an overseas territorial collectivity of France, is officially assigned the ISO 3166-1 alpha-2 code  since 2007, after its secession from Guadeloupe. Moreover, it is also assigned the ISO 3166-2 code  under the entry for France.

Changes
The following changes to the entry have been announced in newsletters by the ISO 3166/MA since the first publication of ISO 3166-2 in 1998:

External links
 ISO Online Browsing Platform: BL
 Saint Barthélemy, Statoids.com

2:BL
Geography of Saint Barthélemy